Mostafa Seyed-Rezaei Khormizi (born June 6, 1984) is an Iranian cyclist.

Palmares
2004
2nd Tour d'Azerbaïdjan
2005
1st stage 7 Tour d'Azerbaïdjan
2006
3rd Tour d'Indonesia
2008
1st stage 1 Kerman Tour

References

1984 births
Living people
Iranian male cyclists
People from Sanandaj
21st-century Iranian people